Adhemar Esquivel Kohenque (April 22, 1929 – July 17, 2013) was a Roman Catholic bishop.

Ordained to the priesthood in 1960, Esquivel Kohenque was named bishop in 1968. In 1992 he was named coadjutor bishop of the Diocese of Tarija, Bolivia and became the diocesan bishop in 1995. He retired in 2004.

References

1929 births
2013 deaths
21st-century Roman Catholic bishops in Bolivia
20th-century Roman Catholic bishops in Bolivia
Roman Catholic bishops of La Paz
Roman Catholic bishops of Tarija